The Polgolla Barrage (also erroneously known as the Polgolla Dam), is a barrage built across the Mahaweli River at Polgolla, in the Central Province of Sri Lanka.

Polgolla Reservoir Waterdrome operates a short distance upstream on the lake created by the barrage.

Power station 

Both units were commissioned in July 1976.

See also 

 List of dams and reservoirs in Sri Lanka
 List of power stations in Sri Lanka

References 

Buildings and structures in Kandy District
Dams in Sri Lanka
Hydroelectric power stations in Sri Lanka
Dams completed in 1976
Barrages (dam)